Kamasins were a collection of tribes of Samoyedic peoples in the Sayan Mountains who lived along the Kan River and Mana River in the 17th century in the southern part of today's Krasnoyarsk Krai.

Russia no longer counts them officially in censuses, although in the 2010 and 2021, two people identified as Kamassian under the subgroup "other nationalities". Also, 0,5% of the population of Sayansky District (21 ppl) are declared as Kamasins and their descendants by the district administration in the official tourist guide (2021).

History 
The origins of the Kamasins remain obscure but it is believed that they are descended from Nenets tribes that were Turkicized. Around the 17th century, the Kamasins moved and settled along the Kan and Mana River.

The Taiga and Steppe Kamasins 
In the late 19th century, the Kamasins were split into two groups: The Taiga and the Steppe Kamasins, each with their own distinct dialect.

The Taiga Kamasins engaged in hunting, reindeer breeding and fishing. The Taiga Kamasins spoke the Kamass dialect of Kamassian until the early 20th century.

The Steppe Kamasins engaged in cattle breeding, horse breeding, farming, and hunting. They spoke the Koibal dialect of Kamassian, a Samoyedic language, until they adopted the Khakas language in the mid-19th century, which is still used today.

Decline 
Many of the Kamasins had assimilated into the Russian peasantry by the early 20th century. Other Kamasins were assimilated into the Koibal subgroup of the Khakass and underwent Turkification. The Kamasins are now ethnically classified as Koibal Khakass or Russian.

In 1989, Klavdiya Plotnikova, the last Native Kamassian speaker of the Kamass dialect, died. She was half Kamassian, and was considered to be the last Kamasin. After her death, they were declared extinct.

See also 

Kamassian language
Klavdiya Plotnovika
Koibals

References

External links
 Article on Red Book of the Peoples of the Russian Empire

Historical ethnic groups of Russia
Nomadic groups in Eurasia